Igor Luksic may refer to:

 Igor Lukšić, Montenegrin politician
 Igor Lukšič, Slovenian politician